The Bureau of Energy Efficiency  is an agency of the Government of India, under the Ministry of Power created in March 2002 under the provisions of the nation's 2001 Energy Conservation Act. The agency's function is to develop programs which will increase the conservation and efficient use of energy in India. The government has proposed to make it mandatory for certain appliances in India to have ratings by the BEE starting in January 2010.
The mission of Bureau of Energy Efficiency is to "institutionalise" energy efficiency services, enable delivery mechanisms in the country and provide leadership to energy efficiency in all sectors of the country. The primary objective would be to reduce energy intensity in the economy.

Actions & Activities
The broad objectives of BEE are as follows:
To exert leadership and provide policy recommendation and direction to national energy conservation and efficiency efforts and programs.
To coordinate energy efficiency and conservation policies and programs and take it to the stakeholders
To establish systems and procedures to measure, monitor and verify energy efficiency results in individual sectors as well as at a macro level.
To leverage multi-lateral, bi-lateral, and private sector support in implementation of Energy Conservation Act and efficient use of energy and its conservation programs.
To demonstrate delivery of energy efficiency services as mandated in the EC bill through private-public partnerships.
To interpret, plan and manage energy conservation programs as envisaged in the Energy Conservation Act.
To promote research and development in energy efficiency and energy conservation.
To develop testing and certification procedures for energy consumption of equipment and appliances and promote the testing facilities.
To strengthen consultancy services in the field of energy conservation.

Energy Audit : The Government of India has identified certain energy intensive industries labelled as 'designated consumers', and made it compulsory for them to conduct Energy Audits following the ‘Bureau of Energy Efficiency (Manner and Intervals of Time for Conduct of Energy Audit) Regulations, 2010’ It has declared new energy standards for ACs which will be applicable from 1 January 2021.

Energy Efficient Lamps: Bachat Lamp Yojana is a voluntary participation program that provides Energy Efficient Compact Fluorescent Lamps (CFLs) at the same cost as regular incandescent bulbs. Participant investors in the sales earn internationally tradeable carbon credits under the Clean Development Mechanism of the Kyoto Protocol.

Standards and Labeling: The BEE has made it mandatory for certain high energy use consumer equipment and appliances to be tested and labeled with their energy performance in order for consumers to be able to make an informed choice about their purchases. The program also allows for some classes of products to volunteer for testing and labeling. The program includes outreach and workshops for sellers to understand the labeling and the cost and energy saving potential of rated equipment and appliances in order for them to inform customers. The program includes a searchable database for consumers to compare products.

See also 
 Bachat Lamp Yojna
 Energy Conservation Building Code
 Standards and Labeling Program
 Life Long Learning (3L) Programme
 Ministry of New and Renewable Energy
 Ministry of Power
 National Mission for Enhanced Energy Efficiency
 Renewable energy in India

References

External links 
 Bureau of Energy Efficiency
 https://igbc.in/igbc/

2001 in law
2002 establishments in Delhi
Energy efficiency
Energy conservation in India
Energy efficiency policy
Government agencies established in 2002
Government agencies for energy (India)
Ministry of Power (India)
Organisations based in Delhi
Vajpayee administration initiatives